Kieran Denvir (January 1932 – 9 August 2022) was a Gaelic footballer and hurler from Northern Ireland. He was a member of the Down senior football team from the early 1950s until 1960. At club level he played with numerous teams, including Kilclief,  University College Dublin, Ballina Stephenites, and Greencastle.

Career
Kieran Denvir came from a family steeped in GAA history. His father James was the first county chairman of Down in 1903 and his three older sisters Una, Roseleen and Angela, represented Down in the 1948 All-Ireland Camogie Final against Dublin. His older brother Brian played Gaelic football and hurling for both Down and Ulster before going on to manage the senior football team.

He first played Gaelic football at St. Malachy's College in Belfast as a schoolboy. He represented the college in the 1949 McRory Cup final. His performances for St Malachy's earned him selection for the Ulster Colleges team which won a provincial title in 1950. 

Once he completed his studies at St Malachy's he enrolled as a veterinary student at University College Dublin in 1952. Over the next eight years, he gained prominence in top class football beyond the county scene, while also making his early appearances for Down back home. While playing club football in Dublin, Mayo and wicklow his fame became well established with superb displays as a midfielder or forward.

As a fresher, his selection at right half-forward on the Sigerson team heralded the start of a brilliant six-year Sigerson Cup campaign at UCD.  His first success came in 1953 and he went on to play in 6 Sigerson Cup finals (including the 1954 final replay) winning four Sigerson Cup titles, including one as team captain in 1955. During that time UCD also won the Dublin senior football League title. He was selected on the Combined Universities team of 1955 vs Rest of Ireland, which also featured Sean Murphy (Kerry), Kevin Heffernan (Dublin) and Sean Purcell (Galway) and further honours followed when he was selected for Ulster in 1955, 1956 and 1958 winning a Railway Cup in 1956.

During his third level studies he was also eligible to play for his home club and in 1955 he won a County Senior Hurling Championship medal for Kilclief playing alongside his older brother Brian.  The following year Kilclief were unable to field a football team, so he played his club football for RGU Downpatrick lining out alongside Derry's Jim McKeever who was living in Downpatrick at the time.

After he finished his studies, his profession took him to Ballina, Co. Mayo, where he transferred to the Ballina Stephenites club. Here he competed in both the league and championship, winning a Mayo senior football league title in 1958 and runners-up medal in the Championship. He subsequently moved on to Baltinglass for a short spell helping them win their first football County Championship (although he missed the final), before moving to Kilkeel to set up his own veterinary practice. Here he finished his club career playing football for Greencastle and hurling for Kilkeel, playing until the late 1960s. In 1963 he added a Down Junior Hurling Championship medal to his collection with the Kilkeel team.

At inter-county level, Denvir played football and hurling for the Down minors from 1949-1950. He made his first Senior Football Championship appearance for Down in 1953 along side Kevin Mussen, Jarlath Carey, PJ McElroy and George Lavery and was a regular member of the team for much of the following decade. As well as representing his native county in football, he also played hurling for Down, captaining the Down hurlers in the 1957 Ulster final. Although he played much of his club football outside of Down due to work commitments, he always remained loyal to his native county regularly travelling long distances to represent Down.

Following defeat to Derry in the 1958 Ulster final, he won his first Senior football silverware in 1959 when Down claimed the McKenna Cup title, before winning their very first Ulster SFC title. Denvir added a Lagan Cup and a National League title to his collection the following year before winning a second successive Ulster medal. He won a Senior Football Championship All-Ireland medal in 1960, replacing Joe Lennon at midfield in the second half, when Down beat Kerry in the 1960 All-Ireland final to claim their first All Ireland title.  A week later he drew the curtain on his intercounty career winning the St Brendan's Cup when Down defeated New York in Croke Park. In early 1961 he stepped away from the county panel due to work commitments.

Kieran Denvir worked as a Veterinary Surgeon until his retirement in 1995. He set up a private practice in Kilkeel County Down, from 1959 until 1973, before joining and working for the Department of Agriculture as a vet until his retirement. He married Monica McManamon from Belmullet County Mayo, whom he met when playing football in Ballina.

Death
Denvir died on 9 August 2022, at the age of 90.

Honours
Club
Down Senior Hurling Championship: 1955
Down Junior Hurling Championship: 1963

University College Dublin
Sigerson Cup: 1953, 1955 (c), 1956, 1957
Combined Universities Team vs Rest of Ireland 1955

Down
All-Ireland Senior Football Championship: 1960
Ulster Senior Football Championship: 1959, 1960
National Football League: 1959–60
McKenna Cup: 1959
Dr Lagan Cup: 1960
Wembley Tournament 1959, 1960
St Brendan's Cup 1960

Ulster
Railway Cup: 1956

References

1932 births
2022 deaths
Ballina Stephenites Gaelic footballers
Down inter-county Gaelic footballers
Ulster inter-provincial Gaelic footballers
UCD Gaelic footballers